Nectomys palmipes, also known as the Trinidad nectomys or Trinidad water rat, is a species of semiaquatic rodent in genus Nectomys of family Cricetidae. It is found on the island of Trinidad and on the nearby mainland of Venezuela.

References

Literature cited

Nectomys
Mammals described in 1893
Mammals of Trinidad and Tobago
Mammals of the Caribbean
Mammals of Venezuela
Taxonomy articles created by Polbot